A referendum on a new electoral system was held in Liechtenstein on 14 February 1932. The proposal was approved by 54.9% of voters.

Results

References

1932 referendums
1932 in Liechtenstein
Referendums in Liechtenstein
Electoral reform referendums
Electoral reform in Liechtenstein
February 1932 events